Thaxterogaster pluvius is a species of fungus in the family Cortinariaceae.

Taxonomy 
It was described in 1821 by the Swedish mycologist Elias Magnus Fries who classified it as Agaricus pluvius. In 1838 Fries reclassified it as Cortinarius pluvius.

In 2022 the species was transferred from Cortinarius and reclassified as Thaxterogaster pluvius based on genomic data.

Habitat and distribution 
It is found in Europe and North America.

See also
List of Cortinarius species

References

External links

pluvius
Fungi of Europe
Fungi of North America
Fungi described in 1821
Taxa named by Elias Magnus Fries